Tau Aquilae, Latinized from τ Aquilae, is the Bayer designation for a star in the equatorial constellation of Aquila. The apparent visual magnitude of 5.7 indicates it is a faint star that is visible to the naked eye from suburban skies; at least according to the Bortle Dark-Sky Scale. The magnitude of the star is diminished by 0.28 from extinction caused by interstellar gas and dust. It is drifting closer to the Sun with a radial velocity of −29 km/s.

The spectrum of Tau Aquilae matches a stellar classification of K0 III, with the luminosity class of III suggesting this is an evolved giant star that has exhausted the supply of hydrogen at its core and left the main sequence of stars like the Sun. It has 21 times the girth of the Sun and is radiating 208 times the Sun's luminosity. The outer envelope is radiating energy into space with an effective temperature of 4,660 K, giving it the orange hued glow of a K-type star.

References

External links
 Image Tau Aquilae

K-type giants
Aquila (constellation)
Aquilae, Tau
Durchmusterung objects
Aquilae, 63
190327
098823
7669